Shao Shuai (Chinese: 邵帅; born 2 January 1989 in Dalian) is a Chinese football player.

Club career
In 2006, Shao Shuai started his professional footballer career with Harbin Yiteng in the China League Two. In the 2011 China League Two campaign he would be part of the team that won the division and promotion into the second tier. He would go on to be a member of the squad as they moved up divisions and gained promotion to the Chinese Super League. He made his Super League debut on 7 March 2014 in a 1–0 away defeat against Shandong Luneng Taishan, coming on as a substitute for Liu Xiaolong in the 89th minute.

Shao transferred to another Super League club Changchun Yatai along with his teammate Han Deming in December 2014. In February 2017, he was loaned to League Two side Hebei Elite until 31 December 2017.

Career statistics 
Statistics accurate as of match played 31 December 2020.

Honours

Club
Harbin Yiteng
 China League Two: 2011

References

External links
Player profile at Soccerway.com

1989 births
Living people
Chinese footballers
Footballers from Dalian
Zhejiang Yiteng F.C. players
Changchun Yatai F.C. players
Chengdu Better City F.C. players
Chinese Super League players
China League One players
China League Two players
Association football defenders